Susanne Hoder is Moderator of the Interfaith Peace Initiative and a member of the Divestment Task Force of the United Methodist Church New England Conference. Since visiting Israel and the West Bank in 2004, she has been an advocate for a just peace in the region based on equality, international law and human rights. She has spoken at numerous conferences and written articles on the situation in the Holy Land.  She has compiled research on publicly held companies that support the Israeli occupation of Palestinian land, urging churches and other organizations to withdraw their investments in these companies until Israel complies with international law.

References
http://www.interfaithpeaceinitiative.com/
http://www.neumc.org/pages/detail/178
http://www.unitedmethodistdivestment.com/, 
http://umportal.org/article.asp?id=2654
 

Living people
American United Methodists
Year of birth missing (living people)